The Pleasure Remains is the third and final single from Camouflage's seventh studio album Relocated, released on January 1, 2007. The single contains remixes by Wet Fingers, Lowe, and Resonance, along with the b-side "Your Own World", which also appeared on the "Something Wrong" single.

Track listing
 "The Pleasure Remains" (radio edit) - 4:02
 "The Pleasure Remains" (Camouflage vs. Wet Fingers - Radio Edit) - 3:27
 "The Pleasure Remains" (Camouflage vs. Wet Fingers - Club Version) - 7:32
 "Your Own World" - 3:34
 "The Pleasure Remains" (Lowe Pleasure Mix) - 4:45
 "The Pleasure Remains" (Rezonance Remix) - 6:55

Credits
Guitar [Propher 5], Synthesizer [Reactor Synth] – Heiko 
Keyboards – Marcus 
Mixed By – Jochen Schmalbach, Ronda Ray (tracks: 4) 
Photography By – Conny J. Winter 
Producer – Heiko Maile 
Vocals – Marcus 
Written-By – Heiko Maile, Marcus Meyn, Oliver Kreyssig

References
http://www.camouflage-music.com/index.php?menu=discography&vid=38http://www.discogs.com/Camouflage-The-Pleasure-Remains/release/865995http://www.camouflage-music.com/en/Discography/Singles

2007 singles
Camouflage (band) songs
2006 songs
Songs written by Heiko Maile